Terry Keith Rodgers (25 January 1943 – 18 February 2023) was an Australian rules footballer who played with Essendon in the Victorian Football League (VFL). He missed Essendon's victorious 1962 premiership team due to an injury he received at training. Rodgers later played for Alexandra.

Rodgers died on 18 February 2023, at the age of 80.

References

External links 

Essendon Football Club past player profile

1943 births
2023 deaths
Australian rules footballers from Victoria (Australia)
Essendon Football Club players
People educated at University High School, Melbourne
Essendon District Football League players